Rotifunk is a town in Moyamba District, in the Southern Province of Sierra Leone. The Sherbro make up the largest ethnic group in the town.

Rotifunk is  the birthplace of Sierra Leonean politician, John Karefa-Smart, and writer, John Akar.

Healthcare 
Hatfield Archer Memorial Hospital, Rotifunk

Namesakes 

There are other towns in Sierra Leone with the same name.

References 

Populated places in Sierra Leone
Southern Province, Sierra Leone